Psychotria fernandopoensis is a species of flowering plant in the family Rubiaceae. It is endemic to Cameroon. Its natural habitat is subtropical or tropical moist lowland forests such as Cameroon, Gulf of Guinea. It is critically endangered, threatened by habitat loss.

References
 

Flora of Cameroon
Critically endangered plants
fernandopoensis